Galan Erilich was a king of the Picts from 510 to 522.

The Pictish Chronicle king lists have him reign for fifteen years between Drest Gurthinmoch and the joint rule of Drest son of Uudrost and Drest son of Girom.

References
Anderson, Alan Orr, Early Sources of Scottish History A.D 500–1286, volume 1. Reprinted with corrections. Paul Watkins, Stamford, 1990.

External links
Pictish Chronicle 

522 deaths
6th-century Scottish monarchs
Pictish monarchs
Year of birth unknown